Johann Ploompuu (4 August 1867 Kiiu Parish (now Kuusalu Parish), Kreis Harrien – 11 December 1943 Harku Parish, Harju County) was an Estonian politician. He was a member of the Estonian Constituent Assembly, representing the Estonian People's Party and of the II Riigikogu, representing the Farmers' Assemblies. He was the older brother of Jakob Ploompuu.

References

1867 births
1943 deaths
People from Kuusalu Parish
People from Kreis Harrien
Estonian People's Party politicians
Farmers' Assemblies politicians
Members of the Estonian Constituent Assembly
Members of the Riigikogu, 1923–1926